William Goldwin Carrington Howland  (March 17, 1915 – May 13, 1994) was a Canadian lawyer, judge and former Chief Justice of Ontario.

Life and career 
Howland was born in Toronto and educated at Upper Canada College.  He graduated from the University of Toronto in 1936, and afterwards enrolled at Osgoode Hall Law School. He was called to the Bar of Ontario in 1939.

During World War II, Howland served with the Royal Canadian Army Service Corps. He appointed Queen's Counsel in 1955 and was elected bencher of the Law Society of Upper Canada in 1961, serving as its treasurer from 1968 to 1970.

In 1975, Howland was appointed a Judge to the Appellate Division of the Supreme Court of Ontario. Two years later, he was appointed Chief Justice of Ontario, and remained in this position until his retirement in 1992.

External links 
Finding aid to the "William G.C. Howland fonds" at the Archives of the Law Society of Upper Canada
Advocacy surrounding Court Signage under the Howland Directive

Justices of the Court of Appeal for Ontario
Members of the Order of Ontario
University of Toronto alumni
1915 births
1994 deaths
People from Toronto
Officers of the Order of Canada
Upper Canada College alumni
University of Toronto Faculty of Law alumni
Osgoode Hall Law School alumni
Canadian King's Counsel